Lost in Love is the fifth studio album by British/Australian soft rock band Air Supply, released in March 1980. Their previous four albums never received much attention outside Australia, but Lost in Love was a success on international charts. In the US it peaked at #22 with three singles reaching the top 5. The album was certified 2× Platinum by the RIAA in 1991.

Overview 
Hit singles include the title track "Lost in Love", which peaked at #3 on US charts in May 1980 and earned Graham Russell a composer award for "song of the year" and "most played song". The song is considered by many to be their signature song and is admittedly Russell Hitchcock's favourite. The single "All Out of Love" became the biggest hit from the album, reaching #2 in the US. It has been regarded as their most famous song, including several interpretations. The third top 5 single of the album, "Every Woman in the World", peaked at #5 in the US. Although never a single, "Chances" has been included on many of the band's hits compilations. "Just Another Woman", a disco song, was originally released on the album Life Support, and was also a hit in Malaysia during the 1980s. In Australia, the album sold 20,000 copies.

Cover art
The album cover was photographed in front of the now-demolished tropical center in the Sydney Botanic Gardens.

Production 
The album achieved mainstream popularity because of the work of producer Clive Davis and the band's new contract with Arista Records, introducing the band into the US. This was the first Air Supply album to crack the American charts. This was also the first Air Supply album to feature songs not written by guitarist/vocalist Graham Russell.

Reaction 
The album gave Air Supply a huge fan base by the time the album was released and gave the band recognition as "most successful pop group" and "best group of 1981". Critics praised the album as their best studio album along with their follow-up album, The One That You Love.

Track listing 
"Lost in Love" (Graham Russell) - 3:51
"All Out of Love" (Graham Russell, Clive Davis) - 3:59
"Every Woman in the World" (Dominic Bugatti, Frank Musker) - 3:33
"Just Another Woman" (Graham Russell) - 3:51
"Having You Near Me" (Graham Russell, Clive Davis) - 4:03
"American Hearts" (Dominic Bugatti, Frank Musker) - 3:13
"Chances" (Graham Russell) - 3:31
"Old Habits Die Hard" (Criston Barker, David Moyse) - 3:03
"I Can't Get Excited" (Graham Russell) - 5:01
"My Best Friend" (Graham Russell) - 2:32

Personnel

Air Supply 
 Russell Hitchcock – lead vocals, backing vocals
 Graham Russell – lead vocals, backing vocals, rhythm guitars
 David Moyse –  lead guitars, backing vocals
 Frank Esler-Smith – keyboards, orchestration
 Criston Barker – bass, backing vocals
 Ralph Cooper – drums, percussion

Additional musicians 
 Sam McNally – keyboards
 Tommy Emmanuel – guitars
 Karl Chandler – tuba
 Tommy Dassalo – triangle, backing vocals
 Robie Porter – orchestration
 Barry Fasman – orchestration (3, 6)

Arrangements 
 Air Supply (1, 2, 4, 5, 7-10)
 Robie Porter
 Barry Fasman (3, 6)
 Harry Maslin (3, 6)

Production
 Executive Producer – Clive Davis
 Producers – Rick Chertoff (Track 1); Charles Fisher (Tracks 1 & 4); Robie Porter (Tracks 2, 5 & 7-10); Harry Maslin (Tracks 3 & 6).
 Engineers – Martin Harrington, Richard Lush and Peter Walker.
 Recorded at Trafalgar Studios, Paradise Studios and EMI Studios 301 (Sydney, Australia); Allen Zentz Recording (San Clemente, CA); 
 Mixing – William Wittman (Track 1); Jim Hilton (Tracks 2, 4, 5 & 7-10; Harry Maslin (Tracks 3 & 6).
 Mix Assistants – Linda Corbin (Tracks 1, 2, 4, 5 & 7-10); John Van Nest (Tracks 3 & 6).
 Mixed at Allen Zentz Recording; Larrabee Sound Studios (Hollywood, CA); Sound Mixers (New York, NY).
 Mastered by John Golden at Kendun Recorders (Burbank, CA).
 Design – Howard Fritzon
 Photography – Patrick Jones

Charts

References

1980 albums
Air Supply albums
Albums produced by Clive Davis
Arista Records albums